The Chief of Defence Forces (CDF) is the professional head of the Uganda People's Defence Forces. He is responsible for the administration and the operational control of the Ugandan military. The position was established after the National Resistance Army was reconstituted as the Uganda People's Defence Forces, three years after the NRA's victory in the Ugandan Bush War in 1986. The current CDF is General Wilson Mbadi.

List of Chiefs

Commander of the National Resistance Army

Chief of Defence Force

References

Military of Uganda
Uganda